Winslow Reef is a submerged coral reef of the southern Cook Islands, located  northwest of Rarotonga, at . It is a shallow platform reef. No major expeditions to explore Winslow Reef have taken place.

Literature
World Atlas of Coral Reefs, by Mark D. Spalding, Corinna Ravilious, Edmund P. Green, University Presses of California, September 2001,

References

Reefs of the Cook Islands